Philiris harterti is a species of butterfly of the family Lycaenidae. It is found in New Guinea.

The larvae feed on Litsea callophyllantha.

Subspecies
Philiris harterti harterti (West Irian)
Philiris harterti leucoma Tite, 1963 (Papua: Hydrographer Mountains, Aroa Range, Kumusi Range)
Philiris harterti melanoma Tite, 1963 (Yapen Island)

References

Butterflies described in 1894
Luciini
Lepidoptera of New Guinea